Casey Andringa (born October 6, 1995) is an American freestyle skier. He competed in, and finished 5th at the 2018 Winter Olympics. In addition to his skiing, he is a well-known photographer and surfer.

References

1995 births
Living people
Sportspeople from Milwaukee
Freestyle skiers at the 2018 Winter Olympics
American male freestyle skiers
Olympic freestyle skiers of the United States